Pedro Carmona da Silva Neto (born 15 April 1988) is a brazilian retired professional footballer who played as an attacking midfielder.

References

External links
 

1988 births
Living people
Brazilian footballers
Association football midfielders
Brazilian expatriate footballers
Esporte Clube Juventude players
Sport Club Internacional players
Figueirense FC players
Esporte Clube São José players
Criciúma Esporte Clube players
Sociedade Esportiva Palmeiras players
Associação Desportiva São Caetano players
Clube Náutico Capibaribe players
Suwon FC players
Sport Club do Recife players
K League 2 players
Brazilian expatriate sportspeople in South Korea
Expatriate footballers in South Korea
Footballers from Porto Alegre